Thoanteus is a genus of gastropods belonging to the family Enidae.

The species of this genus are found in near Black Sea.

Species:

Thoanteus corneus 
Thoanteus ferrarii 
Thoanteus gibber 
Thoanteus zilchi

References

Enidae